The Herbert Range is a mountain range in the Queen Maud Mountains of Antarctica, extending from the edge of the polar plateau to the Ross Ice Shelf between the Axel Heiberg and Strom glaciers.

Named by the New Zealand Antarctic Place-Names Committee (NZ-APC) for Walter W. Herbert, leader of the Southern Party of the New Zealand GSAE (1961–62) which explored the Axel Heiberg Glacier area.

Features
Geographical features include:

 Axel Heiberg Glacier
 Bell Peak
 Bigend Saddle
 Cohen Glacier
 Mount Balchen
 Mount Betty
 Mount Cohen
 Sargent Glacier
 Strom Glacier
 Zigzag Bluff

References

East Antarctica
Queen Maud Mountains
Amundsen Coast